Stephen Rannazzisi (born July 4, 1977) is an American actor and stand-up comedian. He acted in the FXX comedy series The League as  Kevin MacArthur.

Personal life
Rannazzisi, born in Smithtown, New York on July 4, 1977, briefly attended the Catholic St. Anthony's High School in South Huntington, New York on Long Island, leaving after a year in what he called a mutual decision. He went on to graduate from Smithtown High School in 1996. Rannazzisi graduated from State University of New York at Oneonta, where he majored in communications. He is of Italian and Irish descent.

9/11 controversy
Rannazzisi lied about working in the South Tower of the World Trade Center at Merrill Lynch, on the 54th floor during the September 11 attacks, and described his experience escaping death.  He had said the events inspired him to move to Los Angeles and pursue stand-up comedy. In September 2015, after being contacted by a reporter from The New York Times for an article debunking his claim, Rannazzisi admitted his story was a lie. Rannazzisi was never employed by Merrill Lynch, which did not have offices in the World Trade Center then.

Filmography

References

External links
 Official website
 

1977 births
21st-century American male actors
American male comedians
American male film actors
American male television actors
American stand-up comedians
Living people
Male actors from New York (state)
People from Smithtown, New York
State University of New York at Oneonta alumni
Comedians from New York (state)
21st-century American comedians